Tim Pütz and Michael Venus defeated Nikola Mektić and Mate Pavić in the final, 6–3, 6–7(5–7), [16–14] to win the doubles tennis title at the 2022 Dubai Tennis Championships. The pair saved three championship points en route to the win.

Juan Sebastián Cabal and Robert Farah were the defending champions, but chose to play in Acapulco instead.

Seeds

Draw

Draw

Qualifying

Seeds

Qualifiers
  Alexander Bublik /  Altuğ Çelikbilek

Lucky losers

Qualifying draw

References

External links
 Main draw
 Qualifying draw

Dubai Tennis Championships - Men's Doubles
Doubles men